Christine Beaulieu is a Canadian actress and playwright from Quebec. 

She received a Canadian Screen Award nomination as Best Supporting Actress at the 4th Canadian Screen Awards, and a Prix Iris nomination for Best Supporting Actress at the 18th Quebec Cinema Awards, for her performance in The Mirage (Le Mirage), and was again a Prix Iris nominee for Best Supporting Actress at the 24th Quebec Cinema Awards in 2022 for Norbourg.

She won the Gémeaux Award for Best Supporting Actress in a Comedy Series in 2020 for her regular role as Josiane in Lâcher prise. She was previously a nominee in the same category in 2019.

As a playwright, she was shortlisted for the Governor General's Award for French-language drama at the 2018 Governor General's Awards for J'aime Hydro.

Filmography

Film

Television

References

External links

1981 births
Canadian television actresses
Canadian film actresses
Actresses from Quebec
French Quebecers
Living people
21st-century Canadian actresses
21st-century Canadian dramatists and playwrights
Canadian women dramatists and playwrights
Canadian dramatists and playwrights in French
Writers from Quebec
People from Trois-Rivières
21st-century Canadian women writers